Massmart Holdings Limited is a South African firm that owns local brands such as Game, Makro, Builder's Warehouse and CBW. It is the second-largest distributor of consumer goods in Africa, the largest retailer of general merchandise, liquor and home improvement equipment and wholesaler of basic foods. As of 31 October 2022, Massmart operated 411 stores in South Africa and 12 other Sub-Saharan countries. Its head offices are in the Massmart House in Sandton, Johannesburg.

History
Massmart was founded in 1990, beginning with the acquisition of six Makro stores. It listed on the JSE Limited on 4 July 2000 at R12.50 per share. Since its founding, Massmart has grown both organically and by acquisition. The firm acquisition history includes:

 378 Shield members in March 1992
 20 Dion stores in May 1993
 14 CCW stores in June 1998
 26 Game stores in July 1998
 6 Jumbo stores in April 2001
 22 Browns and Weirs stores in July 2002
 8 Builders Warehouse stores in February 2003
 3 De Lay Rey stores, 14 Servistar stores, and 34 Federated Timber stores in June 2005
 6 Cambridge Food stores in December 2008
 3 Buildrite stores in June 2009
 Fruitspot (wholesaler of fresh fruits and vegetables) was acquired in January 2012
 Rhino Cash & Carry Group in March 2012

Divisions

Massmart's stores are organized into 4 divisions. The stores included in each division are as follows:

 Massdiscounters
 DionWired (operates in South Africa)
 Game (operates in South Africa, Botswana, Ghana, Malawi, Mozambique, Namibia, Nigeria, Tanzania, Uganda, Zambia and Kenya - beginning May 2015)

 Masswarehouse
 Makro (operates in South Africa, two stores in Zimbabwe were sold in fiscal year 2011)
 The Fruitspot (operates in South Africa)
 Massbuild
 Builders Warehouse (operates in South Africa, Botswana, Zambia and Mozambique)
 Builders Express (operates in South Africa)
 Builders Trade Depot (operates in South Africa and Mozambique)
 Builders Superstore (operates in South Africa)
 Kangela (operates in Mozambique)
 Masscash
 CBW (operates in South Africa, Botswana, Lesotho, Mozambique, Namibia, and Eswatini)
 Jumbo Cash and Carry(operates in South Africa and Botswana)
 Trident (operates in Botswana)
 Cambridge Food (operates in South Africa)
 Shield (operates in South Africa, Botswana, Lesotho, Namibia, and Eswatini)

Walmart acquisition
In November 2010, Walmart, the American super chain conglomerate made a bid to acquire majority shareholding (51%), in Massmart. At that time, the offer was valued at approximately R:17 billion (approximately US$2.54 billion or £1.54 billion). On 18 January 2011, Massmart shareholders voted in favour of Walmart's offer of R148 per share. The South African Competition Commission Tribunal gave its approval of the acquisition of 51% of the firm in May 2011. Shortly thereafter, in June 2011, Walmart completed the purchase of 51% of the company's stock.

In August the South African ministries of trade and industry, economic development and agriculture and fisheries lodged an appeal to the decision of the Competition Tribunal's decision to allow the merger with minimal conditions, this follows an appeal filed earlier by SACCAWU, a local labor union. In March 2012 the appeals court dismissed the case by the governmental ministries, but acknowledged that there were legitimate concerns about the effect of the deal on small producers and employment. The appeals court decision effectively put an end to the legal challenges to the merger.

Major shareholders 
Below is the group's largest shareholders as at December 2016:

References

External links

Supermarkets
Wholesalers
Food retailers
Companies based in Sandton
Retail companies of South Africa
1990 establishments in South Africa
Retail companies established in 1990
Companies listed on the Johannesburg Stock Exchange
Walmart
2011 mergers and acquisitions
South African companies established in 1990